Raghav Chadha (born 11 November 1988) is an Indian politician and member of the Aam Aadmi Party. He is the youngest Member of Parliament, Rajya Sabha from Punjab, India. He was the Vice Chairman of the Delhi Jal Board and MLA from the Rajendra Nagar assembly constituency in Delhi. Raghav Chadha has been elected as Member of Parliament, Rajya Sabha. He is also a practising chartered accountant.

Early life and career 

Born on 11 November 1988 and raised in New Delhi, Chadha received his school education from the capital city's Modern School, Barakhamba Road and graduated from University of Delhi (DU). He then pursued Chartered Accountancy from the Institute of Chartered Accountants of India, post which he went to the London School of Economics for a certification course of EMBA. In his early career he worked with accountancy firms including Deloitte, Shyam Malpani, and Grant Thornton.

Politics
In 2011, Raghav Chadha joined the uprising against corruption in India, also known as the India Against Corruption movement led by social activist Anna Hazare. He met Arvind Kejriwal during the movement. Raghav Chadha has been a part of the Aam Aadmi Party (AAP) since its inception. Mr. Kejriwal encouraged him in drafting the Delhi Lokpal Bill in 2012, which was also his first political task.  He established himself as the AAP's TV face and also became the youngest national spokesperson of the AAP and one of the youngest across parties. 

When AAP won the 2015 Delhi Legislative Assembly election with a majority, Chadha at the age of 26 was appointed AAP's national treasurer. In April 2018, the then Union Minister of Home Affairs, Rajnath Singh, terminated his appointment as an advisor to Sisodia along with 9 other advisors.

In 2019, he contested from the South Delhi Parliamentary Constituency in the 2019 Lok Sabha elections. He lost in the elections to the BJP candidate, Ramesh Bidhuri and came second. Chadha got the maximum vote share among all the AAP contestants in the election. Since the 1980s, South Delhi has been a BJP stronghold and represented by stalwarts like Madan Lal Khurana and Sushma Swaraj. 

In 2020, as a leader of AAP, he was appointed AAP Punjab co-in-charge for the Punjab Legislative Assembly election. He is recognised as the co-architect of AAP's landslide victory in Punjab when the AAP won 92 out of 117 assembly seats.

MLA in Delhi Assembly
In February 2020, he contested from Rajendra Nagar in 2020 Delhi Legislative Assembly election and won against BJP's candidate RP Singh with a margin of 20,058 votes. He polled a massive 57.06% of the total votes.  Following the elections, he was appointed vice-chairman of the Delhi Jal Board (DJB) and assigned the water portfolio in the Delhi Government.

MP in Rajya Sabha

On 21 March 2022 it was announced that Delhi MLA Raghav Chadha along with four others were nominated by AAP for the post of Rajya Sabha members from Punjab for a six-year term starting 2022. No opposition candidate opposed their election. This made him the youngest MP at age 33. He was also appointed as a Member of the Parliament's Standing Committee on Finance in Rajya Sabha. The committee oversees the laws and policies drafted by three union ministries and the NITI Aayog.

In April 2022, he said that BJP settled Bangladeshis and Rohingyas in Delhi and uses them to cause riots.

Credited with the party's success in Punjab, on 18 September 2022 he was appointed co-in-charge for the 2022 Gujarat Legislative Assembly election.

Advisor to the Chief Minister of Punjab
After AAP's landslide victory in the State, Punjab Chief Minister Bhagwant Mann appointed Raghav Chadha as the Chairman of an Advisory Panel. A plea challenging his appointment
was struck down by the High Court.

Electoral performance

References

Further reading
 

 

 
 

 

Living people
People from New Delhi
Delhi MLAs 2020–2025
Aam Aadmi Party politicians
Delhi University alumni
Indian accountants
1988 births
Aam Aadmi Party candidates in the 2019 Indian general election
Rajya Sabha members from Aam Aadmi Party
Modern School (New Delhi) alumni